Volodymyr Avramenko (born 20 March 1974) is a retired Ukrainian footballer and coach. He spend most of his career to Desna Chernihiv the main club in Chernihiv.

Career
Avramenko started his career Desna Chernihiv in 1992, remaining there until 2004, having spent a number of seasons out on loan.

Honours
Desna Chernihiv
 Ukrainian Second League: 1996–97

References

External links 
Profile on website 

1953 births
Living people
Footballers from Chernihiv
Soviet footballers
FC Desna Chernihiv players
FC Sokil Zolochiv players
FC Dnipro players
FC Nyva Vinnytsia
FC Slavutych players
FC Avanhard Koriukivka players
FC Systema-Boreks Borodianka players
Ukrainian Premier League managers
Association football forwards